Tarek Brahan Carranza Terry (born 24 May 1992) is a Peruvian footballer who plays as a midfielder for Sport Boys in the Primera División Peruana.

Club career
Tarek Carranza was promoted to the Sporting Cristal first team in January 2010. He was given his Torneo Descentralizado league debut by manager Víctor Rivera on matchday 7 of the season. He played the entire match in the 1–2 away win over Sport Boys. He finished his debut season with 14 league appearances.

He scored his first league goal on 2 September 2012 in the 3–1 win over Universidad San Martín, scoring the third after receiving an assist from Jorge Cazulo.

Honours

Club
Sporting Cristal
Torneo Descentralizado: 2012

References

External links

1992 births
Living people
Footballers from Lima
Association football midfielders
Peruvian footballers
Sporting Cristal footballers
Juan Aurich footballers
Cienciano footballers
Sport Loreto players
Alianza Atlético footballers
Ayacucho FC footballers
Carlos A. Mannucci players
Peruvian Primera División players
Peruvian people of Palestinian descent